The Kokra is a river of Slovenia. It flows into the Sava in Kranj.

References

Rivers of Upper Carniola